Amherst-Plymouth Wildlife Management Area is a  protected area located in Putnam County, West Virginia. The site is along the banks of the Kanawha River and is popular for hunting Canada geese in the fall. Access is from West Virginia Route 62 between Bancroft and Hometown and from Manilla Creek Road and Heizer Creek Road off WV 62 north of Poca, West Virginia.  Manilla Creek Road cuts across the north side of the Amherst-Plymouth WMA, and WV 62 follows the southern edge of the area alongside the Kanawha River.

Hunting and fishing

Hunting opportunities include deer, grouse, rabbit, raccoon, squirrel, and turkey.  Fishing opportunities from the banks of the Guano Creek backwater and the Kanawha River include hybrid-striped bass, white bass, carp, channel and flathead catfish, freshwater drum, sauger.

See also

Animal conservation
List of West Virginia wildlife management areas
Recreational fishing

References

External links
West Virginia Division of Natural Resources web site
West Virginia Hunting Regulations
West Virginia Fishing Regulations
WVDNR Map of Amherst-Plymouth Wildlife Management Area

Wildlife management areas of West Virginia
Protected areas of Putnam County, West Virginia
IUCN Category V